Microwave popcorn is a convenience food consisting of unpopped popcorn in an enhanced, sealed paper bag intended to be heated in a microwave oven. In addition to the dried corn, the bags typically contain cooking oil with sufficient saturated fat to solidify at room temperature, one or more seasonings (often salt), and natural or artificial flavorings or both. With the many different flavors, there are many different providers.

Design 

The bag is typically partially folded when it is placed in a microwave, and inflates as a result of steam pressure from the heated kernels.

Microwave popcorn bags are designed to avoid popped-kernel scorching, an undesirable effect that takes place when popped kernels are heated above . A susceptor—usually a metalized film laminated onto the paper of the bag—absorbs microwaves and concentrates heat at the film interface, thus ensuring a heat distribution focused on the hard-to-heat flavor coating so that the unpopped kernels are evenly coated prior to popping, thereby ensuring even flavor throughout the product. 

Some popcorn is flawed and will not pop because of possible damage to the shell, which allows the steam to escape. These unpopped kernels are known as "old maids" or "spinsters".

An early susceptor popcorn bag design was patented by the American company General Mills in 1981 (US Patent #4,267,420).

Safety issues 

Care in package design is needed for food safety.

A safety issue is that the cooking time given on the packaging does not apply to all microwave ovens. Setting the timer and coming back later, after the timer's alarm has sounded, could result in the popcorn being burnt and smoking badly. Microwave popcorn makers suggest that the person cooking the popcorn stay near the oven to observe the popcorn as it cooks, and take the popcorn out when the time between pops is more than a few seconds.

The concern about microwave popcorn bags has increased in the last few years in terms of the waste and their harmful impacts on the environment. A study shows that food packaging accounts for almost two-thirds of the total volume of packaging waste. In addition, the coating materials used in microwave popcorn bags can have negative effects on the environment. Researchers have detected toxic chemicals in the bags, such as perfluorinated compounds (PFCs) and their potential precursors. PFCs are environmentally persistent, bioaccumulative, and potentially harmful. Among PFCs, perfluorooctanesulfonic acid (PFOS) and perfluorooctanoic acid (PFOA) have been reported to be toxic. Perfluorocarboxylic acids (PFCAs) precursors are proved even more toxic than PFCAs themselves. In addition, due to the persistence and mobility properties of PFOA, it has been detected in water, soil, air, and wildlife. To minimize the harmful impacts of PFCs on the environment, people have developed many treatment methods to remove them from aqueous solutions.

Harmful chemicals 
Researchers have detected many PFCs in microwave popcorn bags used as coating materials for oil and moisture resistance. The most commonly studied PFCs are PFOA and PFOS. The amount of PFOA in some microwave popcorn bags is determined as high as 300 μg kg−1. Besides PFOA and PFOS, Moral et al. also determined other perfluorocarboxylic acids (PFCAs) in popcorn packaging, including perfluoroheptanoic (PFHpA), perfluorononanoic (PFNA), perfluorodecanoic (PFDA), perfluoroundecanoic (PFUnA), and perfluorododecanoic (PFDoA) acids.

PFCs are toxic, non-biodegradable and stay in the environment persistently. Accumulation of PFCs in living organism can exert adverse effects in lab animals, aquatic life and humans. A study in rats has found that PFOA can induce liver, testes, and pancreatic tumors. The exposure of PFOS to rats may also results in abnormal glucose and lipid homeostasis in the gestational and lactational adulthood. PFCs have been found to inhibit the communication system and the gene transcription in rats. In addition, a study also suggested that PFOA exposure was associated with kidney and testicular cancer in people living near chemical plants. PFOA and PFOS can also cause membranous damage associated with apoptosis and DNA damage in aquatic organisms (particularly in fish) and negative effect on population growth rate of rotifer.

Due to the toxicity of PFOA, major U.S. manufacturers volunteered to phase out production of PFOA by the end of 2015. In addition, the use of perfluoroalkyl ethyl-containing food-contact substances are no longer allowed by the U.S Food and Drug Administration (FDA) regulations in January 2016. However, although the production of PFOA and PFOS was reduced, the production of fluorotelomer-based chemicals applied to food contact papers is still increasing. Some compounds, such as polyfluoroalkyl phosphate surfactants (PAPs) or fluorotelomers (FTOH), have been used in some brands of microwave popcorn bags. Those compounds are precursors of PFCAs, and evidence shows that they are more toxic than PFCAs themselves. Furthermore, they may also be degraded to PFCAs, and therefore leading to the increase of PFCAs concentrations in the environment and generating adverse effects.

Environmental impacts 
Due to the high energy of C-F bond (531.5kJ/mol) in PFCs, PFCs are extremely resistant to natural biodegradation. Once PFCs are released into the environment, they become contaminants. Evidence shows that water, air, soil, and wildlife have been contaminated by PFCs. For example, PFOA concentrations was up to 0.9 micrograms per liter (µg/L) in some wells in Minnesota between 2004 and 2008, and 0.4 µg/L is the provisional Health Advisory for PFOA in drinking water developed by EPA in 2009. Besides, Giesy and Kannan detected PFCs in fish, birds, and marine mammals around the world. People also detected PFOA in the arctic media and biota.

Because of the large amount of production of microwave popcorn bags, they have also become a significant contaminant source (PFCs) to the environment. Due to the disposal of coated paper and manufacturing activities, PFOA has also been detected in wastewater and biosolids. Soil near disposal sites are contaminated by PFOA as well.

Remediation methods 
To reduce the destructive impacts of PFCs on the environment, people have developed many technologies to remove PFCs from aqueous solutions, including adsorption, ion exchange, membrane separation, photochemical oxidation, ultrasonication, bioremediation, plasma oxidation, and other techniques. These technologies require harsh treatment conditions, cause high energy consumption, and cannot be applied in large scale. Electrochemical oxidation (EO) is a promising technique to remove PFCs from contaminated wastewater. It has many advantages, such as relatively lower energy consumption, milder conditions, and higher removal efficiency.

Electrochemical oxidation mechanism 
The EO mechanism and the pathways of both PFCAs and PFSAs are stated below. At the beginning, the carboxyl or sulfonic acid group of PFCs transfer an electron to the anode, and the PFCs radical (CnF2n+1COO· or CnF2n+1SO3·) are formed. PFCs radicals are unstable, and perfluoroalkyl radicals (CnF2n+1·) are produced. Then, the CnF2n+1· radicals react with OH, O2, and H2O in four possible routes as shown in Cycle A, Cycle B, Cycle C and Cycle D. The detailed reaction processes are as follows:

CnF2n+1COO−→CnF2n+1COO⋅+e−

CnF2n+1COO⋅→CnF2n+1⋅+CO2

CnF2n+1SO3−→CnF2n+1SO3⋅+e−

CnF2n+1SO3⋅+H2O→CnF2n+1⋅+SO42−+2H+

In Cycle A:

CnF2n+1· + ·OH → CnF2n+1OH

CnF2n+1OH + ·OH → CnF2n+1O· + H2O

CnF2n+1O·→ Cn-1F2n-1· + CF2O

In Cycle B:

CnF2n+1OH → Cn-1F2n-1CFO + HF

Cn-1F2n-1CFO + H2O → Cn-1F2n-1COO− + HF + H+

Cn-1F2n-1CFO +·OH → CnF2nO2H·

CnF2nO2H· → Cn-1F2n-1COO· + HF

In Cycle C:

CnF2n+1· + O2 → CnF2n+1OO·

CnF2n+1OO· + RFCOO· → CnF2n+1O· + RFCO· + O2

CnF2n+1O· → Cn-1F2n-1· + CF2O

COF2 + H2O → CO2 + 2HF

In cycle D, volatile fluorinated organic contaminants are released.

EO technique also has some disadvantages, such as high cost and complexity of setting up and operating an electrochemical cell. Due to these disadvantages, EO has not yet been commercialized.

Some microwave ovens have a specific mode designed for cooking popcorn, which either uses factory-calibrated time and power level settings, or which uses humidity or sound sensors to detect when popping has finished.

See also 

 Kettle corn
 List of popcorn brands
 Popcorn maker
 Pop Secret

Notes

External links 
 Microwave popcorn patent dispute between General Mills and Hunt-Wesson
Who Invented Microwave Popcorn?
How was Popcorn Discovered? The History of Popcorn
Who Invented the First Commercial Popcorn Machine?

American inventions
Popcorn
Bags
Food packaging